This is the list of number-one singles in Japan during 1992 according to Oricon Chart

References

1992 record charts
1992 in Japanese music